Bárbara Coronel (1632–1691), was a Spanish stage actress. She belonged to the more famous and popular of her era, and known and celebrated for her masculine acting and her male style in her acting, often performing male parts. She was involved in several scandals which attracted a lot of attention. She was the niece of the actor Juan Rana and married to the actor Francisco Jalón.

References
 Gómez García, Manuel (1998). Diccionario Akal de Teatro. Ediciones Akal. p. 215. .

1632 births
1691 deaths
17th-century Spanish actresses